The 2015–16 season was the 70th season in HNK Rijeka’s history. It was their 25th successive season in the Prva HNL, and 42nd successive top tier season.

Competitions

Overall

Last updated: 14 May 2016.

MAXtv Prva Liga

Table

Results summary

Results by round

Results by opponent

Source: 2015–16 Croatian First Football League article

Matches

MAXtv Prva Liga

Source: Croatian Football Federation

Croatian Cup

Source: Croatian Football Federation

UEFA Europa League

Source: uefa.com

Friendlies

Pre-season

On-season (2015)

Mid-season

On-season (2016)

Player seasonal records
Updated 14 May 2016. Competitive matches only.

Goals

Source: Competitive matches

Assists

Source: Competitive matches

Clean sheets

Source: Competitive matches

Disciplinary record

Source: nk-rijeka.hr

Appearances and goals

Source: nk-rijeka.hr

Suspensions
Updated 14 May 2016.

Penalties

Overview of statistics

Transfers

In

Source: Glasilo Hrvatskog nogometnog saveza

Out

Source: Glasilo Hrvatskog nogometnog saveza

Spending:  €1,375,000
Income:  €7,414,000
Expenditure:  €6,039,000

Notes

References

2015-16
Croatian football clubs 2015–16 season
2015–16 UEFA Europa League participants seasons